Joe Comeau is an American singer, guitarist and songwriter from Rochester, New York. He is best known for his work with Annihilator, Liege Lord and Overkill. He is currently the lead singer for the band DuskMachine and the recently reunited Liege Lord.

Discography

 With Duskmachine
 Duskmachine (2013)

 With Liege Lord
 Master Control (1988)

 With Overkill
 The Killing Kind (1996)
 From The Underground And Below (1997)
 Necroshine (1999)
 Coverkill (1999)

 With Annihilator
 Carnival Diablos (2001)
 Waking the Fury (2002)
 Double Live Annihilation (2003)

References

Singer-songwriters from New York (state)
American male singer-songwriters
Living people
1964 births
Guitarists from New York (state)
American male guitarists
20th-century American guitarists
Annihilator (band) members
Overkill (band) members
20th-century American male musicians